Naguji was the King of Kano from 1194 to 1247. He was the son of Yusa and Yankuma (or Muntaras).

Succession
Gijimasu was succeeded by Gugua (Gujjua), a son of Gijimasu.

Biography in the Kano Chronicle
Below is a biography of Naguji from Palmer's 1908 English translation of the Kano Chronicle.

References

13th-century monarchs in Africa
Monarchs of Kano
1247 deaths